Elm is an unincorporated community in Johnson County, in the U.S. state of Missouri.

History
A post office called Elm was established in 1882, and remained in operation until 1903. The community took its name from a nearby spring where a large elm tree stood.

References

Unincorporated communities in Johnson County, Missouri
Unincorporated communities in Missouri